History of Iberia may refer to:

 History of Iberia (airline), Spanish airline
 History of the Iberian Peninsula, peninsula in the Southwest corner of Europe
 History of the Kingdom of Iberia (302 BC–580 AD), an ancient Georgian kingdom
 History of Sasanian Iberia (523–626/627), the eastern parts of Caucasian Georgia under direct Sasanian rule
 History of the Principality of Iberia (580–880 AD), an aristocratic regime in early medieval Caucasian Georgia